The Hot Heiress is a 1931 American pre-Code comedy film directed by Clarence G. Badger and written by Herbert Fields, with three songs by Richard Rodgers and Lorenz Hart. The film stars Ben Lyon, Ona Munson, Walter Pidgeon, Tom Dugan, Holmes Herbert and Inez Courtney. The film was released by Warner Bros. on March 28, 1931.

Plot
Hap Harrigan is a construction worker who spots socialite Juliette through a window of the building next door and is instantly smitten. She falls for him as well and they begin a romance. But since her family wouldn't approve, she tells them he's actually an architect. Things get sticky when the man she broke up with plans to sabotage their impending engagement.

Cast    
 Ben Lyon as 'Hap' Harrigan
 Ona Munson as Juliette
 Walter Pidgeon as Clay
 Tom Dugan as Bill Dugan
 Holmes Herbert as Mr. Hunter
 Inez Courtney as Margie
 Thelma Todd as Lola
 Nella Walker as Mrs. Hunter

Reception
Mordaunt Hall of The New York Times said, "Under the rather self-consciously moviesque title of The Hot Heiress, the team of Fields, Rodgers and Hart offer at the Strand a musical comedy romance of poverty and riches. The story is too fragile and stale even for the films, whatever Mr. Fields may have read about screen stories, but the comedy is bright and the tunes are in the gay and lilting Rodgers and Hart manner."

Preservation status
 A copy resides in the Library of Congress collection. On April 4, 2018, Warner Archive released it as a Region 1 made-on-demand DVD. It also airs occasionally on Turner Classic Movies.

References

External links 
 
 
 
 

1931 films
1930s English-language films
Warner Bros. films
American comedy films
1931 comedy films
Films directed by Clarence G. Badger
American black-and-white films
1930s American films
English-language comedy films